Ogden Township may refer to the following places in the United States:

 Ogden Township, Champaign County, Illinois
 Ogden Township, Riley County, Kansas
 Ogden Township, Michigan

Township name disambiguation pages